This is a list of school districts in Nevada, where school district boundaries coincide with county boundaries.  Carson City is an independent city and has its own school district.

Public

 Carson City School District
 Churchill County School District
 Clark County School District
 Douglas County School District
 Elko County School District
 Esmeralda County School District
 Eureka County School District
 Humboldt County School District
 Lander County School District
 Lincoln County School District
 Lyon County School District
 Mineral County School District
 Nye County School District
 Pershing County School District
 State Sponsored Charter School
 Storey County School District
 Washoe County School District
 White Pine County School District

Charter

Churchill County
 Oasis Academy

Clark County

 Amplus Academy (2 schools)
 Beacon Academy of Nevada
 CIVICA
 Coral Academy of Science (6 schools)
 Democracy Prep
 Discovery Charter School (2 schools)
 Doral Academy (5 schools)
 Equipo Academy
 Explore Academy
 Founders Classical Academy of Las Vegas
 Freedom Classical Academy
 Futuro Academy
 Girls Athletic Leadership School
 Imagine School Mountainview
 Leadership Academy of Nevada
 Legacy Traditional Schools (3 schools)
 Mater Academy (3 schools)
 Nevada Prep
 Nevada Rise
 Nevada State High School (7 schools)
 Nevada Virtual Academy
 Pinecrest Academy of Nevada (5 schools)
 Quest Preparatory Academy
 Sage Collegiate
 Signature Prep
 Somerset Academy (7 schools)
 Sports Leadership and Management Academy
 TEACH Las Vegas

Elko County
 Elko Institute for Academic Achievement

Washoe County

 Alpine Academy
 Doral Academy of Northern Nevada
 Honors Academy of Literature
 Mater Academy of Northern Nevada
 Nevada Connections Academy
 Nevada State High School Meadowood
 Pinecrest Academy of Northern Nevada

White Pine County
 Learning Bridge Charter School

References
Schools & Districts - Nevada Department of Education. Retrieved on 2008-07-31.

 
School districts
Nevada